Alexandra Bell may refer to:

 Alexandra Bell (artist) (born 1983), American artist
 Alexandra Bell (athlete) (born 1992), British athlete